Jahyn Vittorio Parrinello (born 8 August 1983) is an Italian professional boxer. As an amateur he competed in the 2008 and 2012 Olympics.

Career
At the 2008 Olympics at bantamweight he lost his first fight to 2004 silver medalist Worapoj Petchkoom  1:12 

At the 2009 World Championships he lost his first bout to Denis Makarov.

At the 2011 World Amateur Boxing Championships he lost his second bout.

At the 2012 Summer Olympics (results) he beat Namibian Jonas Matheus but lost to the eventual winner, local Luke Campbell 9:11.

Professional boxing record

References

External links
 

Living people
1983 births
Italian male boxers
Olympic boxers of Italy
Boxers at the 2008 Summer Olympics
Boxers at the 2012 Summer Olympics
Super-bantamweight boxers
Featherweight boxers
Super-featherweight boxers
Sportspeople from Piedimonte Matese
21st-century Italian people